Lorenzo Malik Mauldin IV (born October 1, 1992) is a professional gridiron football defensive end for the Ottawa Redblacks of the Canadian Football League (CFL). He was drafted by the New York Jets in the third round of the 2015 NFL Draft. He played college football at Louisville.

Early years
Mauldin was born in Sacramento, California on October 1, 1992. He spent most of his childhood with 16 different foster parents as both of his parents were in jail. Mauldin attended Maynard H. Jackson High School in Atlanta, Georgia, where he played football and basketball and competed in track. In high school football, Mauldin was named to Class AA All-State Team. In track & field, Mauldin competed in events ranging from the high jump to the discus throw. At the 2010 Whitefield Meet, he took fourth in the discus throw (114 ft 4 in) and second in the shot put (44 ft 7 in).

Regarded as a three-star prospect by Rivals.com, Mauldin was rated as the 82nd-best player in Georgia. He was rated as the 67th-best defensive end by ESPN.com, and the 133rd-best defensive end by Scout.com. He chose Louisville over Kentucky, Middle Tennessee, South Alabama, Troy and South Carolina, where he originally committed.

College career
As a true freshman at the University of Louisville in 2011, Mauldin played in all 12 of the Cardinals games and recorded six tackles. As a sophomore in 2012, Mauldin started six of 11 games, recording 22 tackles and a team-leading 4.5 sacks. In August 2013, prior to his junior season, Mauldin was involved in a hit and run moped accident. He recovered and started all 13 games that season. He finished the year with 40 tackles and 9.5 sacks. Prior to his senior season in 2014, Mauldin was moved from defensive end to linebacker.

Professional career

New York Jets
Mauldin was selected by the New York Jets in the third round (82nd overall) of the 2015 NFL Draft. He signed a four-year, $3 million contract on May 7, 2015.

Mauldin played his first regular season game on September 13, 2015 against the Cleveland Browns, where he forced a fumble off Johnny Manziel. However, after forcing the fumble, he suffered an apparent neck injury, was rendered unconscious for a few minutes, carted off the field, and taken to a local hospital. After undergoing tests, he was diagnosed with only a concussion and luckily, no serious neck injury. During his rookie season in 2015, Mauldin played 15 games making 10 tackles, 4 sacks, and a fumble recovery.

On September 4, 2017, Mauldin was placed on injured reserve after dealing with a back injury throughout training camp. On September 1, 2018, Mauldin was released by the Jets.

Hamilton Tiger-Cats
Mauldin signed with the Hamilton Tiger-Cats on April 15, 2019. He played in 11 regular season games where he recorded seven defensive tackles, seven special teams tackles, and three sacks. He did not play in 2020 due to the cancellation of the 2020 CFL season, and opted to sign a one-year contract extension on January 4, 2021. He played in six games where he had six defensive tackles, five special teams tackles, one sack, and one forced fumble.

Ottawa Redblacks
On February 8, 2022, it was announced that Mauldin had signed with the Ottawa Redblacks. 2022 was a breakout year for Mauldin. He led the league with 17 sacks and won the CFL's Most Outstanding Defensive player award. As a pending free agent Mauldin and the Redblacks agreed to a one-year contract extension on January 18, 2023.

Personal life
On June 11, 2017, it was revealed that Mauldin attacked another customer at a Manhattan nightclub two months prior to the announcement. The battle started when the customer spilled champagne on Mauldin, triggering his attack. The victim was punched twice, left with a black eye, and hospitalized. On June 21, 2017, Mauldin turned himself in to police, and was charged with misdemeanor assault.

References

External links
Ottawa Redblacks bio
Louisville Cardinals bio

1992 births
Living people
Players of American football from Atlanta
American football defensive ends
American football linebackers
Louisville Cardinals football players
New York Jets players
Hamilton Tiger-Cats players
Ottawa Redblacks players
Canadian football linebackers
American players of Canadian football
Canadian Football League Most Outstanding Defensive Player Award winners